Aruva Sanda is a 2022 Indian Tamil-language drama film directed by Aadhirajan and starring V. Raja, Malavika Menon and Aadukalam Naren in the lead roles. It was released on 30 December 2022.

Cast
V. Raja as Muthu
Malavika Menon as Ramya
Aadukalam Naren
Soundararaja
Saranya Ponvannan as Valli
Ganja Karuppu
Kadhal Sukumar
Vijay TV Sarath
G. Marimuthu
Madurai Sujatha

Production
The film began production in mid-2017, with the makers initially planning a release in early 2018. Aadhirajan made his third film after Silandhi (2008) and Ranatantra (2016), and cast the film's producer, kabaddi player V. Raja in the lead role, alongside Malavika Menon. Saranya Ponvannan and Aadukalam Naren were signed on to portray other pivotal roles. During the shoot in August 2017, Soundararaja injured Raja with a sickle by accident.

In March 2018, the High Court stayed the film's release owing to apparent financial fraud by V. Raja.

Reception
The film was released on 30 December 2022 across Tamil Nadu. A reviewer from Dina Malar noted that the director had created an engaging film about caste violence, A critic from Dina Thanthi also gave the film a middling review.

References

External links

2022 films
2020s Tamil-language films